Talbotiella gentii is a medium-sized forest tree in the family Fabaceae. It is endemic to Ghana.  It is threatened by habitat loss and is a species monitored by Ghana as a measure of environmental success in preserve biodiversity in forests.

References

Detarioideae
Endemic flora of Ghana
Critically endangered flora of Africa
Trees of Africa
Taxonomy articles created by Polbot